NBW may refer to

Nebelwerfer weapons
Neighborhood Bike Works
Netbabyworld
North by West, see Boxing the compass
IATA code for Leeward Point Field in Guantánamo Bay, Cuba